Brazilians form the largest Latin American diaspora group in Ireland by a wide margin. Historically, Irish people tended to emigrate to Brazil rather than the other way around. However, this trend has reversed since the late 20th century. According to the data from the Brazilian consulate, they make up to 1% of Ireland's population in 2020.

History

In 1991, Brazil opened an embassy in Dublin.

According to the Paulo Azevedo of the Brazilian embassy, there have been three waves of Brazilians moving to Ireland: factory workers during the Celtic Tiger years (late 1990s into the 2000s), students from the 2000s to the present, and then engineers and IT specialists.

It is said Jerry O'Callaghan was working in the meat industry in Goiás, Brazil when the company shut down. He organised for the Brazilians who had lost their jobs to move Ireland in 1999 where they found work at the Duffy Meat Plant in Gort, County Galway. By 2006, they made up a third of the population of Gort, which was dubbed Little Brazil. However, the closure of Duffy and the 2008 financial crash jeopardised their employment and thus residence permits, causing some to leave. A 2008 documentary on the Brazilian community in Gort won the Silver Angel Award.

Roscommon also drew a number of Brazilians, who made up around 10% of the town's population by 2003 according to Chris Dooley. Some of these were workers at the Kepak factory in Athleague with families back in Brazil who intended to return. Others brought their families over to settle more permanently for security.

In the 2000s, more Brazilians began coming to Ireland for study. Ed Giansante of eDublin, an organisation for Brazilians interested in moving to Ireland, believes the second wave began around 2007. The reason many Brazilians seeking to study in an English-speaking country choose Ireland is that Ireland is especially accessible to them. Many work in retail and food service alongside their studies.

For the third consecutive year, eDublin carried out a large survey with Brazilians living in Ireland and analyzed in the survey that 22% of the Brazilian students spend to cover their living costs.

The average amount spent on food by the Brazilian exchange student in Ireland remains in the range of 101 to 200 euros/month, with 50% of the responses.

While, in 2021, the average salary of a Brazilian student in Ireland was 1,200 euros per month, in 2022, the average income went up to 2,000 euros per month.

Annie Rozario of the Gort Resource Centre suggests there has been "an unacknowledged fourth wave" in recent years due to economic and political conditions back home, particularly among young people who are disillusioned by the Bolsonaro government. In 2021, the Brazilian Left Front organised protests in Dublin, Galway, and Cork alongside cities in other countries in solidarity with the ongoing anti-Bolsonaro protests back home.

Demographics
The 2016 census recorded around 13,640 non-Irish national residents of Brazilian origin, a figure more than tripled from a decade earlier. Eurostat reported that there were 27,192 Brazilians holding Irish residence permits in 2019, having consistently increased since 2016. This number fell to 22,481 in 2020 due to the COVID-19 pandemic.

Around two thirds (64%) of Brazilians according to the 2016 census were concentrated in County Dublin, the highest concentration of all non-Irish nationalities profiled. The rest were mostly found in Kildare, Galway, and Roscommon.

97% of Brazilian nationals in 2016 were under the age of 50, with a quarter being between the ages of 25 and 28 and only 10% of them being over 40. This would make Brazilians Ireland's youngest demographic with an average age of 29.9 years old, an increase of 1 year from the 2011 data. 50% were in work and 32% were students.

Culture and community
Amigos of the Earth is a beach cleanup group started to give back to the local community. Real Events has hosted Brazil Day since 2012 as well as hosting Carnaval in February and Festa Junina in June.

Edublin organizes the largest event for Brazilians planning to move to Ireland in Sao Paolo every year.

Notable people
 David da Silva, former Shelbourne F.C. footballer

See also

 Brazil–Ireland relations
 Gort
 Irish Brazilians

References

Ethnic groups in Ireland
Ireland